Jimmy Walker (born 1925, date of death unknown) was a Scottish footballer, who played as a winger for Renfrew, Heart of Midlothian, Partick Thistle and Third Lanark.

Born in Detroit, Michigan but raised in Paisley, Renfrewshire, Walker represented Scotland once, in January 1946. Walker is deceased.

See also
 List of Scotland international footballers born outside Scotland

References

1925 births
Date of birth missing
Year of death missing
Place of death missing
Scottish footballers
Association football wingers
Renfrew F.C. players
Heart of Midlothian F.C. players
Partick Thistle F.C. players
Third Lanark A.C. players
Scottish Football League players
Scotland international footballers
Soccer players from Detroit
Association football midfielders
Footballers from Paisley, Renfrewshire
American emigrants to Scotland
Scottish Junior Football Association players